The Rio Grande do Norte gubernatorial election will be held on 5 October 2014 to elect the next governor of the state of Rio Grande do Norte.  If no candidate receives more than 50% of the vote, a second-round runoff election will be held on 26 October.

Governor Rosalba Ciarlini sought nomination for a second term, but her candidacy was vetoed by her party due to her low approval ratings.

Candidates

References

2014 Brazilian gubernatorial elections
Rio Grande do Norte gubernatorial elections
October 2014 events in South America